165 University Avenue or Lucky Building or Karma Building is a small rented office building on University Avenue, the main commercial street in downtown Palo Alto, California, that gave rise to Plug and Play Tech Center and to the Amidi Group. It is run by Rahim & Saeed Amidi, whose family fled from the Iranian revolution in the 1970s. Located near Stanford University, the building has served as an incubator for several noted Silicon Valley companies, including Logitech, Google, PayPal, Danger, Inc (bought by Microsoft), BetterWorks, Milo.com (bought by eBay), WePay (acquired by J.P. Morgan) and Yummly (bought by Whirlpool). YouTube also provides this location as the example address when setting the location of an uploaded video. Until 2000, the ground floor was home to a Palo Alto institution, Chimaera Books & Music. Like many independent bookstores, its closure was due, in part, to competition from the dot com economy.

References

External links 

 News.com: "A building blessed with tech success"
 San Jose Mercury News: "Rugs to Riches"
 New York Times: "Rental Building’s Good Karma Nurtures Success"
 Max Levchin's Paypal Slideshow: Brings Sleeping Bag to Sleep in Office
 Logitech History at 165 University with Historic Photos 
 Milo.com, the newest startup to occupy the legendary 165 University office space
 Marketplace, May 18, 2010:  "The place for good business karma"

Buildings and structures in Palo Alto, California
Palo Alto, California